Omar Fierro (born October 10, 1963) is a Mexican television actor and  host who has appeared in many soap operas in and outside Mexico, movies and television shows such as Cada Mañana, A Ganar con Omar and the Mexican version of Jeopardy!. 

He currently hosts the Mexican show Quién Tiene Estrella each Sunday.

Actor

2021: Mi fortuna es amarte TV series .... Elías Haddad Nassar
2020: La mexicana y el güero TV series .... Agustín Gastellum
2020: Te doy la vida TV series .... Horacio Villaseñor
2018: Señora Acero 5 TV series .... Christian Almeida
2018: Hijas de la luna   TV series .... Juan Oropeza
2012: La Mujer de Judas   TV series .... Bruno
2011: Emperatriz   TV series .... Armando Mendoza
2010: La Loba    .... Ignacio (unknown episodes)
2009: Bajo Amenaza: 42 km. de angustia   .... Alberto
2009: Vuélveme A Querer   .... Samuel Montesinos
2008: Vivir por ti   TV series .... Roberto
2005: La ley del silencio   TV series .... Francisco
2001: Lo que callamos las mujeres   .... Guillermo (1 episode, 2001)
2000: La calle de las novias   TV series .... Manuel Ortega
1999: Buenas noches   TV series .... Host
1999: Julius   TV series .... Santiago
1998: Tres veces Sofía   TV series .... Federico Vidaurri
1998: Tentaciones   TV series .... Martín Farías
1998: "Jeopardy!" A Mexican version of U.S. NBC Jeopardy! game show (from 1998 to 2000)
1997: Prisioneros del amor   TV series .... Pietro Caligari
1996: La sombra del deseo   TV series .... Alejandro
1995: A oscuras me da risa
1995: Si Dios me quita la vida   .... Alfredo Román (1 episode, 1995)
1994: A ritmo de salsa
1994: Más allá del puente   TV series
1993: Yo, tú, el, y el otro
1993: Reto a la ley
1993: Hades, vida despues de la muerte   (V)
1993: Sueño de amor   TV series .... Antonio
1993: S.I.D.A., síndrome de muerte   (V) .... Edgar
1992: Noches de ronda   .... Ramon Esparza
1992: Soy libre
1992: Perros de presa
1992: El tigre de la frontera
1992: Anatomia de una violación   .... Teniente
1992: Revancha implacable   (V)
1992: Lo blanco y lo negro   TV series .... Armando de Castro (unknown episodes)
1991: Verano peligroso   .... Luis Pinoncito
1991: Descendiente de asesinos   .... Alberto Fonseca
1991: Donde quedo el colorado
1990: Dios se lo pague
1990: Cuando llega el amor   TV series .... Luis Felipe
1990: Mi pequeña Soledad   TV series .... Carlos
1990: Lo inesperado
1990: Furia asesina
1988: Amor en silencio   .... Ángel (1 episode, 1988)
1988: Monte Calvario   TV series .... Román
1987: Quinceañera   .... Arturo (2 episodes, 1987)
1987: Lamberto Quintero   .... Jorge Balderrama
1986: Lavadores de dinero
1985: Vivir un poco   TV series
1984: Principessa TV series .... Casimiro
1984: ¡¡Cachún cachún ra-ra!! (Una loca, loca, preparatoria)
1983: La pobre Señorita Limantour   TV series (unknown episodes)
1981: ¡¡Cachún cachún ra ra!!   TV series .... Titán

References

1963 births
Living people
Mexican male telenovela actors
Mexican male television actors